Ruben Figueres (born 1974) is a political consultant from Gandia, Spain. He has worked with Barack Obama in his re-election to the White House, during the 2012 United States presidential election.

Career
Figueres also heads the Alario Group, a Chicago-based advertising agency for political campaigns and companies that want to enter the Hispanic market. In 2015, he published the book De Gandia a la Casa Blanca (From Gandia to the White House), which describes his journey from Spain to the US and his reflections on the Obama campaign.

Books
 De Gandia a la Casa Blanca

References 

Living people
American political consultants
1974 births